Thyrassia inconcinna is a species of moth in the family Zygaenidae first described by Charles Swinhoe in 1892. It is found in Queensland, Australia.

There are at least two generations per year.

The length of the forewings is 10–11 mm for males and 12-12.5 mm for females. The forewings are large, triangular, grey brown with a short orange-yellow basal streak, three large, whitish-yellow spots at two-thirds and two small spots of the same colour close to the apex. The hindwings are small and rounded. There are three partially confluent yellow spots on the base of the wing.

The larvae feed on Vitis species.

References

Moths described in 1892
Procridinae